The 1988 Virginia Slims of San Diego was a women's tennis tournament played on outdoor hard courts at the San Diego Tennis & Racquet Club in San Diego, California in the United States and was part of the Category 2 tier of the 1988 WTA Tour. The tournament ran from August 1 through August 7, 1988. Second-seeded Stephanie Rehe won the singles title and earned $17,000 first-prize money.

Finals

Singles

 Stephanie Rehe defeated  Ann Grossman 6–1, 6–1
 It was Rehe's 2nd singles title of the year and the 5th of her career.

Doubles

 Patty Fendick /  Jill Hetherington defeated  Betsy Nagelsen /  Dianne van Rensburg 7–6(12–10), 6–4
 It was Fendick's 6th title of the year and the 6th of her career. It was Hetherington's 4th title of the year and the 5th of her career.

References

External links
 ITF tournament edition details
 Tournament draws

Virginia Slims of San Diego
Southern California Open
Virg
Virg